Andrew Colvin  is an Australian police officer who was the Commissioner of the Australian Federal Police from September 2014 to September 2019. On 5 January 2020, Colvin was appointed to lead the newly-established National Bushfire Recovery Agency.

Early life and education
From July 2009 and May 2010 he studied for and received a Masters in Public Administration from Harvard University’s John F. Kennedy School of Government.

Career
Colvin joined the Australian Federal Police in 1990 and has worked in policing narcotics, money laundering, politically motivated crime, illegal pornography and terrorism financing. He oversaw Australia's policing response to the 2002 Bali bombings, for which he was awarded the Medal of the Order of Australia (OAM), upgraded to the AO in 2022 in 2003, and the Australian Embassy bombings in Jakarta.

In 2008 Colvin was awarded the Australian Police Medal (APM).

He replaced Commissioner Tony Negus as head of the AFP in September 2014 and did not seek a contract extension and stepped down from the role in September 2019.

Career chronology

 1990: Joined Australian Federal Police
 2002: Superintendent, National Coordinator Counter Terrorism
 2003: Medal of the Order of Australia (OAM)
 2005: Chief of Staff
 2006: Assistant Commissioner
 2007: Street Review
 2008: National Manager High Tech Crime Operations
 2008: Australian Police Medal (APM)
 2010: Masters in Public Administration
 2010: Deputy Commissioner Operations
 2014: Appointed Commissioner
 2019: Stepped down as Commissioner
 2022: Promoted to Officer of the Order of Australia (AO) in the 2022 Australia Day Honours for "distinguished service to law enforcement, to counter terrorism initiatives, and to bushfire recovery programs".

Personal life
Andrew Colvin is married with two children.

References

Commissioners of the Australian Federal Police
Harvard Kennedy School alumni
Year of birth missing (living people)
Living people
Officers of the Order of Australia
Recipients of the Australian Police Medal